Tiandao (Vietnamese: Thiên Đạo, Japanese: Tendō) is a Chinese word used in many philosophical and religious contexts in China and the Sinosphere. It can also refer specifically to:
 Xiantiandao, a group of Chinese religions
 Yiguandao, a particular religion in this group
 Tendo (religion), a Japanese sect of this religion
Other uses include:
 Mou Zongsan (1909–1995), New Confucian philosopher
 A Manifesto for a Re-appraisal of Sinology and Reconstruction of Chinese Culture (1958), group work
 Huang-Lao 2nd-century BCE Chinese school of philosophy

Traditional thought 

 Tao, often referred to as Tiandao, is an important concept passed down from ancient Chinese thinkers to the present day.

Organizations 

 Cheondoism，also known by the name Tiandao as the Chinese reading of its name
  a Taiwanese organized crime organization
  a new religious movement in China originating in Taiwan related to Yiguandao

See also
 Tendō (disambiguation)